"Dingbat the Singing Cat" is a 1940s pop song by Freddy Martin and His Orchestra, adapted from Prokofiev's "Peter and the Wolf".

History
Adapted and arranged from the Russian Composer Sergei Prokofiev's symphonic fairy tale "Peter and the Wolf" with music and lyrics by Al Hoffman and Ted Mossman, it was recorded in 1946 by Freddy Martin and His Orchestra. Performed in the swing style, it features on vocals Stuart Wade, Glenn Hughes and the Martin Men.

Release details
Released by RCA Victor in June 1946 as a 78rpm 10" shellac recording, it was the 'A' side of catalog number 20-1908 ('B' side was Happy Journey).

Other  recordings
In 2007, it was remixed by independent artist Dalt Wisney and released on the EP 'Lifetime Psychedelic Dance Lessons'

References

1946 songs
Songs written by Al Hoffman
Songs with music by Ted Mossman